Malus sublobata is the botanical name for the yellow autumn crabapple, it is a species of the genus malus in the family Rosaceae, native to Japan.

This tree produces blossoms of pink and white coloration, and yellow fruit.

References

 Malus sublobata Rehder [family ROSACEAE]

sublobata
Crabapples
Endemic flora of Japan